India's Got Talent is a televised Indian Hindi language talent show series and is part of the Got Talent franchise. The program is produced and distributed by Fremantle. The show aired on Colors TV till season 8; since season 9 the show is airing on Sony Entertainment Television.

Format

Auditions 
Since season 9, the general selection process begun with Sony Liv online auditions, those that make it through the initial stage, become participants in the "judges' auditions," which are held in select cities across the country. At the end of a performance, the judges give constructive criticism and feedback about what they saw, whereupon they each give a vote - a participant who receives a majority vote approving their performance, moves on to the next stage, otherwise they are eliminated from the show. Also the show's presenter(s) stands in the wings of stage to interview and give personal commentary on a participant's performance.

Each judge has a buzzer, and may use it during a performance if they are unimpressed, hate what is being performed, or feel the act is a waste of their time; if a participant is buzzed by all judges, their performance is automatically over and they are eliminated.  A "golden buzzer" was introduced in season 5; in season 9 it is used by judges to select and send the act directly to the "top 14," escaping judges' cuts.

Judge cuts 
Many acts that move on may be cut by in judge's cuts and may forfeit due to the limited slots available.

Finals 
According to season 9, after the judge's cuts, the selected acts along with golden buzzer acts and wild cards compete against each other in a weekly competition for viewers' and judges' votes.  Acts which do not secure a sufficient number of votes by the public and/or the judges, are eliminated from the competition.

Selected acts moves to the semi-final round, when they compete against each other to get the spot in finale via viewers votes and to win the trophy.

Judges and hosts

Notes	

 Farah Khan replaced Malaika Arora midway. 
 VJ Andy replaced Mantra Midway. 
 Malaika Arora served as guest judge in absence of Shilpa Shetty.

Season overview

Season 1 (2009)

Season 1 was hosted by Nikhil Chinapa and Ayushmann Khurrana and the special segment called "India's Got More Talent" was hosted by Roshni Chopra. The show was judged by Sonali Bendre, Kirron Kher and Shekhar Kapur.

The winning act of the first season was the Prince Dance Group from Berhampur, Orissa. The group of 56 people performed a dance inspired by the Lord Vishnu's Dashavatara.

Season 2 (2010)

Season 2 was hosted by the same duo, Nikhil Chinapa and Ayushmann Khurrana, as they were selected through voting by the judges and the viewers. Sonali Bendre and Kirron Kher continued their roles as judges, however Shekher Kapur was replaced by Sajid Khan.

The winners of season 2 were the Shillong Chamber Choir, led by Neil Nongkynrih from Shillong, Meghalaya.

Season 3 (2011)

Season 3 was hosted by singer Meiyang Chang and actor-model Gautam Rode. The judges of this season were Sonali Bendre, Kirron Kher and Dharmendra.

The second runner-up of season 2, SNV Group (named after members Suresh Mukund and Vernon Monteiro), emerged as the winner of the season.

Season 4 (2012)

Season 4 was hosted by Manish Paul and Cyrus Sahukar. Kirron Kher, Malaika Arora Khan, and Karan Johar were judges. Farah Khan later replaced Malaika Arora Khan.

Dancers Sonali Majumdar and Maraju Sumanth, who formed the duo Bad Salsa from Kolkata's Bivash Dance Academy, were crowned winners of the fourth season.

Season 5 (2014)

Season 5 was hosted by Mantra and Bharti Singh. Later, Mantra was replaced by VJ Andy. Malaika Arora Khan, Kirron Kher and Karan Johar reprised their roles as judges.  Ragini Makkhar's Naadyog Academy won the season. Indore, Madhya Pradesh-based Ragini Makkhar's Naadyog Academy is a 25-year-old dance institution which consists of 360 students.

Season 6 (2015)

Season 6 was hosted by Bharti Singh, Nakuul Mehta and Sidharth Shukla. Malaika Arora Khan, Kirron Kher and Karan Johar reprised their roles as judges. Aerial dancer Manik Pauk won the season winning a cash prize of ₹50,00,000.

Season 7 (2016)

Season 7 was hosted by Bharti Singh and Sidharth Shukla.
Malaika Arora Khan, Kirron Kher and Karan Johar reprised their roles as judges.  Flautist Suleiman, a 13-year-old flute player from Amritsar, Punjab won the season, and Papai and antara bagged the runner-up positions.

Season 8 (2018)

Season 8 was hosted by Bharti Singh and Rithvik Dhanjani. Malaika Arora Khan, Kirron Kher and Karan Johar reprised their roles as judges.  27-year-old close-up magician Javed Khan had a tie with Live 100 Experience Band in the final stage, but with more votes coming his way, he was awarded the trophy and prize money of Rs 25 lakh.

Season 9 (2022)

Season 9 is hosted by Arjun Bijlani. Kirron Kher continue serving as judge for the ninth season along with Shilpa Shetty Kundra, Baadshah and Manoj Muntashir. The format of the show changed was changed.  Flute & beat box duo Divyansh & Manuraj won the season, whereas Ishita Vishwakarma and Bomb Fire Crew finished as runner-up and 2nd runner-up, respectively.

Notes and references

External links

Indian reality television series
Colors TV original programming
Got Talent
2009 Indian television series debuts
Television series by Fremantle (company)
Music competitions in India
Indian television series based on British television series